Nils Olof "Olle" Hellbom (8 October 1925 – 5 June 1982) was a Swedish film director, producer, and screenwriter. He is most famous for directing films based on novels by Astrid Lindgren. His 1960 film Alla vi barn i Bullerbyn was entered into the 2nd Moscow International Film Festival. In 1978 at the 14th Guldbagge Awards he won the award for Best Director for his film The Brothers Lionheart.

He died of stomach cancer.

Filmography

Director
 1957 - Mästerdetektiven Blomkvist lever farligt
 1959 - Raggare!
 1960 - Alla vi barn i Bullerbyn (TV movie)
 1964 - Vi på Saltkråkan (TV series)
 1964 - Tjorven, Båtsman och Moses
 1965 - Tjorven och Skrållan
 1966 - Tjorven och Mysak
 1967 - Skrållan, Ruskprick och Knorrhane
 1969 - Pippi Longstocking (1969 TV series) (TV series)
 1970 - Pippi Långstrump på de sju haven
 1970 - På rymmen med Pippi Långstrump
 1971 - Emil i Lönneberga
 1972 - Nya hyss av Emil i Lönneberga
 1973 - Emil och griseknoen
 1974 - Världens bästa Karlsson
 1977 - Bröderna Lejonhjärta
 1981 - Rasmus på luffen

Writer
 1951 - Kvinnan bakom allt
 1951 - Hon dansade en sommar
 1955 -  Voyage in the Night 
 1980 - To Be a Millionaire
 1981 - Tuppen

Producer
 1981 - Tuppen
 1976 - Mina drömmars stad
 1975 - En kille och en tjej
 1972 - Mannen som slutade röka

References

External links

1925 births
1982 deaths
People from Mörkö
Deaths from cancer in Sweden
Deaths from stomach cancer
Swedish film directors
Best Director Guldbagge Award winners
Producers who won the Best Film Guldbagge Award